Bela is a village in Palwal district of Haryana, India. It is in Palwal.

References

Villages in Palwal district